Spodnji Jakobski Dol is a settlement in the Municipality of Pesnica in northeastern Slovenia. It lies in the Slovene Hills, part of the traditional region of Styria. The municipality is now included in the Drava Statistical Region.

The parish church in the settlement is dedicated to Saint James and belongs to the Roman Catholic Archdiocese of Maribor. It is a Gothic structure dating to the 14th century that was extensively restyled in 1635.

References

External links
Spodnji Jakobski Dol on Geopedia

Populated places in the Municipality of Pesnica